"I Just Need U" (stylized as "I just need U.") is a song by Christian hip hop musician TobyMac. It was released as a single on January 5, 2018. The song debuted at No. 1 on the Hot Christian Songs chart, becoming his sixth No. 1 on the chart. It spent 30 weeks on the overall chart.

Background
On December 21, 2017, Toby posted a photo on his Instagram page revealing that he is planning on releasing a new single at the beginning of 2018. On January 1, 2018, he officially confirmed the release of the single with a tease of the cover. The song was released on January 5, 2018.

The song is about finding God rather than relying on his own strength. He wrote the song with Bryan Fowler and Finding Favour's Blake NeeSmith. He expresses how important the song means to him in an interview:

In another interview with Billboard, he told about the story of the song and how it was put together:

Music video
A music video for "I Just Need U" was released on March 24, 2018. The visual features Toby driving through the scenic Southern California desert. As of November 2021,the video has over 65 million views on YouTube.

Track listing
Digital download
"I just need U." – 3:46
Digital download (Capital Kings Remix)
"I just need U." – 3:05

Charts

Weekly charts

Year-end charts

Decade-end charts

Certifications

References 

2018 singles
TobyMac songs
Songs written by TobyMac
ForeFront Records singles
EMI Christian Music Group singles
2018 songs